An incomplete list of events which occurred in Italy in 1691:

 28 June, Siege of Cuneo is fought

Births
 Ferdinando Ruggieri, architect (dies 1741)

Deaths
 8 February, Carlo Rainaldi, architect (born 1611)

References